The 2017–18 MSV Duisburg season was the 118th season in the club's football history. In 2017–18 the club played in the 2. Bundesliga, the second tier of German football after being promoted.

Team

Transfers

In

Out

Friendlies

Results
Times from 1 July to 29 October 2017 and from 25 March to 30 June 2018 are UTC+2, from 30 October 2017 to 25 March 2018 UTC+1.

Overview

2. Bundesliga

League table

Results summary

Result round by round

Matches

DFB-Pokal

Statistics

Squad statistics
As of 13 May 2018.

|}

Goals
As of 13 May 2018.

Clean sheets
As of 13 May 2018.

Disciplinary record

References

External links

German football clubs 2017–18 season
MSV Duisburg seasons